As the Health and Community Services Industry is being defined it is important that the Australian Community Sector is defined.

There are many different views and debate within the Community Sector about how the sector is defined. The traditional methods of defining the Community Sector are:
organisation type (funded or non-funded)
legal status (unincorporated associations, incorporated associations, companies limited by guarantee or for profit companies)
structure (local, regional, national)
service provision (direct or indirect)
service type (face to face, online or referral)
A new and important definition, is defining organisations by the function they provide in a local community. A large organisation may provide several different functions within its community with different activities and different target groups.

Publisher: AST Management Pty Ltd

Accessible online http://anzdmc.com.au/proceedings.pdf pp301

Society of Australia